"D.AAA" is the 10th single of the all-girl Thai idol group BNK48. It was released in Thailand on March 13, 2021. This is the group's first original composed main single that consists of "D.AAA" and two b-side songs, "Sukida Sukida Sukida - ชอบเธอนะ" and "Only today" which has 2 versions: Band Version and Acapella Version.

Track listings

Type A

Type B

Participating members 
Note: The following is the list of members performing in each song. Members in bold refers to the center of the song (team status at the time of the single's release).

"D.AAA - ดีอะ" 

 Performed by 16 members consisting of:

 Team BIII: Cherprang, Jane, Jennis, Kaew, Minmin, Noey, Pun, Wee
 Team NV: Gygee, Kaimook, Mobile, Music, Namneung, Orn, Pupe, Tarwaan

"Sukida Sukida Sukida – ชอบเธอนะ" 

 Performed by 16 members consisting of:

 Team BIII: Cherprang, Jane, Jennis, Kaew, Minmin, Noey, Pun, Wee
 Team NV: Gygee, Kaimook, Mobile, Music, Namneung, Orn, Pupe, Tarwaan

"Only today – Band Version (Type A)" 

 Performed by 7 members consisting of:

 Team BIII: Korn (Keyboard), Panda (Bass & Vocal)
 Team NV: Bamboo (Drums), Namsai (Drum Pad), Nine (Electric Guitar & Vocal), Phukkhom (Keyboard), Satchan (Acoustic Guitar)

"Only today – Acapella Version (Type B)" 

 Performed by 7 members consisting of:

 Team BIII: Miori, Myyu, Niky
 Team NV: Fond, Jaa, New, Stang

Awards and nominations

References 

2021 singles
BNK48 songs